Gunther O. Hofmann (born 22 May 1957 in Landshut, Bavaria) is a German surgeon, biophysicist, and professor.

Early life and education
Gunther O. Hofmann was born in 1957 in Landshut, Bavaria.

Hofmann attended medical school and earned a Staatsexamen and a doctorate (Dr. med.) from the Ludwig Maximilian University of Munich. Thereafter, he moved to the Technical University Munich, wherefrom he graduated in 1984 with a Dr. rer. nat. (Doctor rerum naturalium) in physics.

Career
In 1987, Hofmann commenced work as a research fellow at the Klinikum of the Ludwig Maximilians University of Munich until he started his Habilitation in 1992. During his Habilitation, Hofmann did research at the Massachusetts General Hospital in Boston, Massachusetts, and started to work in the hospital of the Ludwig-Maximilians-Universität München in the same year.

In 1995, he moved to the Berufsgenossenschaftliche Unfallklinik (BG Trauma Hospital) Murnau.

Since 2004, Hofmann has been the Medical Director of Berufsgenossenschaftliche Kliniken Bergmannstrost Halle, Saxony-Anhalt and Director of Hospital for Trauma, Hand, and Reconstructive Surgery at the Friedrich Schiller University of Jena, Thuringia.

Research interests
His major research fields are Development of implants for osteosynthesis and joint replacement, bone and joint grafting, biomaterials, biomechanics, computer-assisted surgery, infections of bones
 Example (2010): Development of a prosthetic hand with microsensors

Selected works
 1988 Quantitative Elektromyographie in der Biomechanik (Quantitative electromyography in biomechanics) in: Physik in unserer Zeit (Physics in our time) Volume 19, Issue 5, pages 132–136,
 1997 Biologisch abbaubare Knochenimplantate (Biodegradable bone implants) in: Spektrum der Wissenschaft 2/1997
 2001 Clinical experience in allogeneic vascularized bone and joint allografting in: Microsurgery Volume 20 Issue 8 p. 375–383, 2000 Microsurgery Special Issue: Proceedings of the Second International Symposium on Composite Tissue Allotransplantation, Louisville, Kentucky
 2003 Therapeutische Optionen bei persistierendem Kniegelenkinfekt in: Trauma und Berufskrankheit Volume 5, Supplement 2, p. 221-224 Springer-Verlag Heidelberg
 2004 Infektionen der Knochen und Gelenke (Infections of bones and joints) in: Traumatologie und Orthopädie, Verlag Urban & Fischer München/Jena
 2005 Modular Uncemented Tricompartmental Total Knee Arthroplasty in: European Journal of Trauma and Emergency Surgery, 2005/2
 2006 Knochen- und Gelenktransplantation (Bone and joint transplantation) in: Transplantationsmedizin. Ein Leitfaden für den Praktiker p. 241-252 Walter de Gruyter Verlag Berlin
 2009 Radiation- and reference base-free navigation procedure for placement of instruments and implants: Application to retrograde drilling of osteochondral lesions of the knee joint in: Computer Aided Surgery 2009 Volume 14 No. 4-6 p. 109-116 (Hofmann a.o.)

Awards
 1986 Otto-Götze-Award of the Association of Bavarian Surgeons (in German: Vereinigung der Bayerischen Chirurgen)
 1997 Herbert-Stiller-Award of the Physicians Against Animal Experiments (in German: Ärzte gegen Tierversuche)
 2008: Science4Life Venture Cup for the development of an optical system for detection of osteoarthritis (Team arthrospec AG)

References

External links
 biography  Dr. Dr. Hofmann at the official website on the BG-Kliniken Bergmannstrost Halle
 Profile of Gunther O. Hofmann at BiomedExperts

1957 births
Physicians from Bavaria
German biophysicists
Living people
German materials scientists
German orthopedic surgeons
Technical University of Munich alumni
People from Landshut
Academic staff of the Ludwig Maximilian University of Munich